Hydrelia rubrivena is a moth in the family Geometridae first described by Alfred Ernest Wileman in 1911. It is found in Taiwan.

References

Moths described in 1911
Asthenini
Moths of Taiwan